The Burrendong Botanic Garden and Arboretum is located near Mumbil, south-east of Wellington in the Central West region of New South Wales, Australia.  Established in 1964 as a result of the efforts of George and Peter Althofer, the 167 ha garden opens from 7.30 am to sunset every day of the year

Facilities and activities
Picnic areas, toilets, views of the lake, varied walks, plant sales, children's treasure hunts and guided tours are available at certain times. Native animals and birds may be seen on site, such as kangaroos and emus.  Special features are the plantings of rainforest plants in the Fern Gully, the Mint Bushes and the collection of plants from Western Australia.

See also
 List of botanical gardens
Mayfield Garden, another garden in Central West NSW

References

Notes

Sources
 Burrendong Arboretum
 Burrendong Arboretum: locality map
 Wellington, New South Wales: Burrendon Botanic Garden and Arboretum

Botanical gardens in New South Wales
1964 establishments in Australia
Arboreta in Australia